Highway 392 (AR 392 and Hwy. 392) is a former east–west state highway in Clark County, Arkansas.

History
It was created by the Arkansas State Highway Commission on July 24, 1968, to serve as industrial access for a plywood plant. It was removed from the state highway system on October 26, 1977, following the plant's closure.

Major intersections

See also

References

392
Transportation in Clark County, Arkansas